Ľubiša is a village and municipality in Humenné District in the Prešov Region of north-east Slovakia.

History
In historical records the village was first mentioned in 1410.

Geography
The municipality lies at an altitude of 174 metres and covers an area of 10.021 km2.
It has a population of about 840 people.

Municipality
In 2021, 42.7% of municipal waste produced in Ľubiša was separated for recycling, which was an annual rise by 8%.

References

External links
 
 
 Statistics department

Villages and municipalities in Humenné District